Wilnecote railway station is a small unmanned station serving Wilnecote 1.5 miles (2 km) south of Tamworth town centre in Staffordshire, England. The station is situated beneath a bridge which carries the former A5 Watling Street.

History
It was opened in 1842 by the Birmingham and Derby Junction Railway as Wilnecote and Fazeley, the name being shortened in 1904.

In 1889, John William Leader, a corn merchant of Tamworth was killed at the station when crossing the tracks he was struck by an express from Derby.

Stationmasters
In 1961 Brian A. Martin was appointed station master a few months after his twentieth birthday and was at the time the youngest station master on British Railways.

Joseph Passey ca. 1851 - 1860
William Hunt 1860 - 1879
G. Hull 1879
A. Withers 1879 - 1880
William Headford 1880 - 1888  (formerly station master at Great Glen)
George E. Cookson 1888 - 1899 (formerly station master at Finedon)
Samuel Allanach 1900 - 1906 (afterwards station master at West Bridge, Leicester)
Henry Molineux 1906 - 1908
George Parker 1908 - 1931
Percy Jackson 1931 - 1932 (formerly station master at Church Gresley)
Walter J. Crisp 1932 - 1933
Noel Manton 1933 - 1940 (formerly station master at Borrowash, afterwards station master at Oakham)
F.A. Brown from 1940 
Brian A. Martin from 1961

Services
West Midlands Trains manage the station but do not provide any train services there.

References

External links

Railway stations in Staffordshire
DfT Category F2 stations
Former Midland Railway stations
Railway stations in Great Britain opened in 1842
Railway stations served by CrossCountry
Railway stations in Great Britain not served by their managing company